Aluísio Marsili (born 30 August 1947) is a Brazilian water polo player. He competed in the men's tournament at the 1968 Summer Olympics.

References

1947 births
Living people
Brazilian male water polo players
Olympic water polo players of Brazil
Water polo players at the 1968 Summer Olympics
Water polo players from Rio de Janeiro (city)
20th-century Brazilian people